Solera is a process for aging liquids such as wine, beer, vinegar, and brandy, by fractional blending in such a way that the finished product is a mixture of ages, with the average age gradually increasing as the process continues over many years. The purpose of this labor-intensive process is the maintenance of a reliable style and quality of the beverage over time. Solera means "on the ground" in Spanish, and it refers to the lower level of the set of barrels or other containers used in the process; the liquid is traditionally transferred from barrel to barrel, top to bottom, the oldest mixtures being in the barrel right "on the ground", although the containers in today's process are not necessarily stacked physically in the way that this implies but merely carefully labeled. Products which are often solera aged include Sherry, Madeira, Lillet, Port wine, Marsala, Mavrodafni, Muscat, and Muscadelle wines; Balsamic, Commandaria, some Vins doux naturels, and Sherry vinegars; Brandy de Jerez; beer; rums; and whiskies. Since the origin of this process is the Iberian peninsula, most of the traditional terminology is in Spanish and Portuguese.

Solera process 

In the solera process, a succession of containers are filled with the product over a series of equal aging intervals (usually a year). A group of one or more containers, called scales, criaderas ('nurseries'), or clases are filled for each interval. At the end of the interval after the last scale is filled, the oldest scale in the solera is tapped for part of its content, which is bottled. Then that scale is refilled from the next oldest scale, and that one in succession from the second-oldest, down to the youngest scale, which is refilled with new product. This procedure is repeated at the end of each aging interval. The transferred product mixes with the older product in the next barrel.

No container is ever completely drained, so some of the earlier product always remains in each container. This remnant diminishes to a tiny level, but there can be significant traces of product much older than the average, depending on the transfer fraction. In theory traces of the very first product placed in the solera may be present even after 50 or more cycles. In Andalusia, Spain, the latest regulations for labeling require careful labeling and record-keeping, usually via computer, allowing the winemaker or regulator to easily access the average age of each container, which depends not only on the refreshment interval and number of scales, but also the relative volumes that are chosen for the refreshment process — a larger refreshment and final removal for bottling will result in a younger average age (see Aging). The upper quality levels implied by the labeling system require the bottled wine to be greater in age than the regulatory requirements.

Aging 

The age of product from the first bottling is the number of containers times the aging interval.

For instance, suppose the solera consists of three barrels of wine, and half of each barrel is transferred once a year.  At the end of the third year (and each subsequent year), half the third barrel is bottled. This first bottling is aged three years. The third barrel is then refilled by transferring half of the wine from the second barrel. The wine transferred from the second barrel has an average age of 2.5 years (at the end of year 2, after barrel transfers, it was half 2-year old wine, half 1-year old wine, for an average age of 1.5 years; at the end of year 3, before barrel transfers, it will have aged another year for an average age of 2.5 years). The second bottling will then be half 3.5 years old and half four years old (the wine left in the last barrel at the previous cycle), for an average age of 3.75 years. The third bottling will be an average age of 4.25 years (one half wine that was left over from the second bottling – average age 4.75 years, and one half wine transferred from the second barrel after the second bottling – average age 3.75 years). After 20 years, the output of the solera would be a mix of wine from 3 to 20 years old, averaging very slightly under five years. The average age asymptotically converges on five years as the solera continues.

Solera production 
The output of the solera is the fraction of the last scale taken off for bottling each cycle. The amount of product tied up in the solera is usually many times larger than the production. This means that a solera is a very large capital investment for a winemaker. If done with actual barrels, the producer may have several soleras running in parallel. For a small producer, a solera may be the largest capital investment, and a valuable asset to be passed down to descendants. An economic concomitant of the Andalusian wine industry are Almacenistas ('warehousers', small or larger investors who purchase solera-produced material and maintain it over many years so that it can be purchased for current needs by bodegas that are actively blending for the market.

Wine produced from a solera cannot formally have a vintage date because it is a blend of vintages from many years. However, some bottlings are labeled with an age for marketing reasons, which could be the date that the solera was founded. In most instances, It is unclear whether such age indications denotes the average age, or the age of the oldest batch. In Andalusia, the various average age categories, up to 30 years of age at present, are much better documented to the regulatory body and on the bottle labels at present than they were just a decade or two ago.

History
The first written mention of the solera may be in the 1849 inventory of the house of Garvey, though the term was probably in use earlier.

Solera in different countries 
This process is known as solera in Spanish, and was developed by the producers of sherry. In a Spanish sherry solera, the vintner may transfer about a third of each barrel a year. A solera sherry has to be at least three years old when bottled.

A quite similar process is called sostrera, used to produce fortified wines in the Mediterranean regions of France.

In Sicily, where Marsala wine is made, the system is called in perpetuum.

Solera vinification is used in the making of Mavrodafni ("Black Laurel"), a fortified red dessert wine made in the Northern Peloponnese in Greece. Exceptional Mavrodafni vintages are released every 20 or 30 years: they are of minimal availability and expensive.

Vintners in Rutherglen, Australia produce fortified muscat-style and Tokay-style wines using the solera process. In South Australia, some fortified wines (akin to tawny port) are made from blends of Shiraz, Grenache and Mourvedre.

Glenfiddich, a Speyside distillery in Scotland, has a 15-year-old whisky that uses a vatting process similar to the solera. The whisky is labelled as their "15 year old single malt Scotch Whisky". For Scotch whisky, the stated age must refer to the youngest of whisky's components. Barrels are emptied into the solera vat and mixed. Then whisky is drawn from the vat to be bottled, with the vat never being more than half emptied. Since the process began in 1998, the vat has never been emptied.

In France some producers use the "perpétuelle" method to blend base wines for Champagne across the years for non-vintage Champagne such as Francis Boulard Cuvée Petraea.

The oldest port wine producer in America, Old Vine Tinta Solera at Ficklin, has used a solera since 1948.

In Okinawa, Japan, where awamori is made, the traditional system similar to the solera is called shitsugi.

The solera process has been used since the 17th century to produce sour ales in Sweden, where it is known as "hundraårig öl" (hundred-year beer). The beer is rarely commercially available, being instead made at the large manors for private consumption.

A process of partially emptying and refilling barrels with beer is undertaken by craft breweries in the United States.

See also
 Perpetual stew

Notes

References

External links
 Website of the Denominación de Origen of Jerez
Website of the Denominación de Origen Montilla-Moriles: Criaderas and Soleras 
 Aging: the Solera Method demystified... by The Rum Project
The Solera system on SherryNotes

Winemaking
Sherry
Wine packaging and storage